Zachary Claman DeMelo (born April 20, 1998) is a Canadian professional race car driver from Montreal, Quebec. He has competed in Formula Renault 2.0, the IndyCar Series and other open-wheel series, most recently competing for Belardi Auto Racing in Indy Lights in 2019.

Racing career

Karting and lower formula

Claman DeMelo began competing in various regional and national karting events in 2008. In 2010, at the age of 12, he clinched his first Canadian National Karting Championship as well as his first Eastern Canadian Karting Championship. By the age of 16, he had won 3 Canadian National Karting Championships, 5 consecutive Eastern Canadian National Championships, and earned a 3rd-place finish at the Rotax Karting World Championships. Claman DeMelo made his car racing debut in the 2014–15 Formula Skip Barber winter series, where he won two of the four races.

In 2015, Claman DeMelo moved to Europe and participated in a handful of races in several Formula Renault 2.0 series, including Formula Renault 2.0 NEC, Formula Renault 2.0 Eurocup, and Formula Renault 2.0 Alps. From there, he moved on to the Invitational class of the MSV F3 Cup, where he claimed a win in all 8 races he drove in.

Indy Lights

In 2016, he entered Indy Lights  as the youngest driver on the grid (at 17 years old) with defending championship team Juncos Racing. In his rookie campaign, Claman DeMelo put up 9 finishes in the top 10 and 3 finishes in the top 5. In 2017, Claman DeMelo raced for the 2016 defending championship team, Carlin Motorsport. He captured his first series win at Road America and captured a pair of podium finishes in Toronto. He finished fifth in points, just four points behind teammate Matheus Leist in fourth.

Unable to secure a full-time ride in the NTT IndyCar Series, Claman DeMelo chose to return to Indy Lights for the 2019 season, this time with Belardi Auto Racing. After winning the season-opening round at St. Petersburg, the season went south for the team, and budget issues ended Claman DeMelo's season before the Freedom 100.

IndyCar Series
In July 2016, Claman DeMelo participated in an IndyCar Series test with  Schmidt Peterson Motorsports. He made his IndyCar debut in the 2017 season finale at Sonoma Raceway with Rahal Letterman Lanigan Racing.

In February 2018, Claman DeMelo was named a part-time driver of the No. 19 Paysafe Honda for Dale Coyne Racing in the 2018 IndyCar Series.

Personal life
One of Claman DeMelo's grandmothers spent time in a Nazi concentration camp. She was freed on a Friday the 13th, and the tattoo numbers added up to 13. He has used number 13 on his racecars during most of his career.

In 2016, Claman DeMelo and his sister launched a shoe brand called ZCD Montreal. Currently focused on its women's division, ZCD Montreal shoes have been featured in People magazine, Vogue and The Wall Street Journal. Celebrities such as Victoria's Secret model Devon Windsor and actresses Margot Robbie and Elisha Cuthbert have also been seen wearing ZCD shoes.

Racing record

American open-wheel racing results

Indy Lights

IndyCar Series

* Season still in progress.

Indianapolis 500

References

External links

1998 births
Living people
Canadian people of Portuguese descent
Canadian racing drivers
Carlin racing drivers
Formula Renault 2.0 NEC drivers
Formula Renault Eurocup drivers
Formula Renault 2.0 Alps drivers
Indy Lights drivers
IndyCar Series drivers
Indianapolis 500 drivers
Racing drivers from Quebec
Dale Coyne Racing drivers
Rahal Letterman Lanigan Racing drivers
Belardi Auto Racing drivers
Juncos Hollinger Racing drivers
Fortec Motorsport drivers